The 2015–16 Ligue 1 is the 57th season of top-tier football in Côte d'Ivoire. The season began on 28 November 2015. AS Tanda defended their first league title, holding off Séwé Sport by going unbeaten in their last eight matches.

The league comprised 14 teams, the bottom two of which, Korhogo and Yopougon, were relegated to the 2017 Ligue 2.

Teams
A total of 14 teams will contest the league, including 12 sides from the 2014–15 season and two promoted from the 2014–15 Ligue 2, Moossou FC and Yopougon FC.
On the other hand, Bouaké FC and Stella Club d'Adjamé were the last two teams of the 2014–15 season and will play in Ligue 2 for the 2015-16 season. AS Tanda are the defending champions from the 2014–15 season.

Stadiums and locations

League table

Positions by round

Season statistics

Scoring
First goal of the season: Krahire Yannick Zakri for ASEC against Abengourou (28 November 2015)

References

Ligue 1 (Ivory Coast) seasons
Ivory Coast
1